Kibungan, officially the Municipality of Kibungan, is a 4th class municipality in the province of Benguet, Philippines. According to the 2020 census, it has a population of 17,051 people.

Geography
Kibungan is at the northwestern section of Benguet. It is bounded by Bakun on the north, Buguias on the mid-east, Kabayan on the southeast, Atok and Kapangan on the south, and Sugpon on the mid-west.

According to the Philippine Statistics Authority, the municipality has a land area of  constituting  of the  total area of Benguet.

Kibungan has seven barangays namely; Sagpat, Poblacion, Palina, Tacadang, Madaymen, Badeo, and Lubo. Barangay Sagpat and Lubo produces sayote as their main crop, sayote was tagged the "hanging gold". Barangay Madaymen and Palina also produces varieties of vegetables like cabbage, potatoes, carrots, and more. Barangay Tacadang and Badeo is not accessible by vehicle because of the rocky mountains and its hard to construct road.

Kibungan is known in the province of Benguet as the town with unique mountains often mistaken to resemble those of Switzerland. Deep ravines and cliffs separate and isolate many sitios and some barangays. Although some plateaus, hills and small valleys can be seen in the locality, Kibungan is dominantly mountainous.

Barangays
Kibungan is politically subdivided into 7 barangays. These barangays are headed by elected officials: Barangay Captain, Barangay Council, whose members are called Barangay Councilors. All are elected every three years.

Climate

Demographics

In the 2020 census, Kibungan had a population of 17,051.

Economy

Government
Kibungan, belonging to the lone congressional district of the province of Benguet, is governed by a mayor designated as its local chief executive and by a municipal council as its legislative body in accordance with the Local Government Code. The mayor, vice mayor, and the councilors are elected directly by the people through an election which is being held every three years.

Elected officials

Tourism

 Les-eng Rice Terraces: These terraces can be reached after 6-hour hike through lush pine forests in Barangay Tacadang.
 Mayos River: located at the north-eastern part of Barangay Poblacion. The river originates from ridges of nearby Barangays Madaymen, Palina and Tacadang; and supplies water to rice paddies and vegetable farms along the vicinity.
 Palina Rice Terraces: In Barangay Palina at the foot of Mount Kilkili, believed to be a former volcano because of its conical shape. It was constructed following a century-old system of rice terraces built with stone walls and neatly arranged one after the other. The rice terraces are at their best in December and June when the rice paddies turn golden yellow, near harvest time. The Palina rice terraces is known as the municipality's rice granary.
Lubo Lake: It was an open pit abandoned by the BONENG MINES operated by the WMC due to bankruptcy. The pit was filled with water in the early 2001 due continues rains and typhoons and no way to go out.
 A road network links the area to the town proper and other barangays but public transport vehicles are limited.
Tacadang Hiking Circuit

In order to promote the uniqueness of the municipality's ecotourism, the people want the tag "Switzerland of Benguet" removed as of 2007. The tag was created in good faith as the municipality is a mountainous region and has a cool climate that is associated with Switzerland. However, this gives the wrong impression that the municipality has snow-covered peaks for skiing.

Education

Public schools
As of 2014, Kibungan has 24 public elementary schools and 3 public secondary schools.

Notes

References

External links

 [ Philippine Standard Geographic Code]

Municipalities of Benguet